Noroît (Une vengeance) is a 1976 experimental adventure fantasy drama directed by Jacques Rivette. The title is an alteration of nord-ouest (north-west), meaning the direction or the wind from that direction (in English, a "nor'wester"). The story is loosely based on Thomas Middleton's The Revenger's Tragedy. The film stars Geraldine Chaplin and  Bernadette Lafont as pirates. Noroît would have followed Duelle (1976) as the third episode of the intended four-film series Scènes de la vie parallèle (the first being a supernatural love story and the fourth a musical).

Plot
On a beach, Morag (Chaplin) weeps over the lifeless corpse of her brother, Shane and vows to avenge his death. Shane was killed by Giulia (Lafont), the leader of a band of pirates that inhabit the island's castle. Amongst Giulia's band are three men, Jacob, Ludovico and Arno. Morag enlists Erika to be a spy in the pirate's castle and she is employed by Giulia as a bodyguard. Giulia's pirate gang attack a boat and Erika attempts to use the distraction as an opportunity for Morag to stab Giulia. However, the plot fails when Morag is hesitant; the boat attack continues and Jacob is injured.

Morag uses her dead brother's body as a trap to ensnare another Giulia ally, Regina. She pours poison on the lips of Shane and leaves him in Jacob's bed. Erika and Morag organize a theater where they mimic the scenario of Regina's death. In a rage by the turn of events, Giulia kills a pirate. She then decides to send Jacob to seduce Erika. Meanwhile, Ludovico attempts to discover the location of hidden treasure. Morag is betrayed by Erika and stabs her. At a masked ball hosted by Giulia, Morag decides to attend and finally avenge Shane. In the battle of the two women, they kill each other.

Cast
Geraldine Chaplin as Morag
Bernadette Lafont as Giulia
Kika Markham as Erika
Humbert Balsan as Jakob
Larrio Ekson as Ludovico
Anne-Marie Reynaud as Arno
Babette Lamy as Regina
Danièle Rosencranz as Celia
Élisabeth Lafont  as Elisa
Carole Laurenty as Charlotte
Anne-Marie Fijal as Fiao
Marie-Christine Meynard as Tony
Anne Bedou as Romain
Georges Gatecloud as Arno's brother

Production
The film was shot in 1975 in Brittany.

References

External links
 

1976 films
French drama films
1976 drama films
1970s French-language films
French avant-garde and experimental films
Films directed by Jacques Rivette
1970s avant-garde and experimental films
1970s French films